is a Japanese film made in 1997 by the Shochiku studio and directed by Katsuo Naruse. It centers on two characters: Mayako, played by Kaho Minami, a young woman who is not content with her husband and begins to have many affairs with other men, and Kiriko Okabe, played by Isako Washio, a woman whom she befriends. Mayako's husband is played by Jinpachi Nezu.

References

External links

Japanese drama films
1990s Japanese-language films
1990s Japanese films